The Roman Catholic Church in Uganda is composed of 4 ecclesiastical provinces and 15 suffragan dioceses.

List of dioceses

Episcopal Conference of Uganda

Ecclesiastical Province of Gulu
Archdiocese of Gulu
Diocese of Arua
Diocese of Lira
Diocese of Nebbi

Ecclesiastical Province of Kampala
Archdiocese of Kampala
Diocese of Kasana–Luweero
Diocese of Kiyinda–Mityana
Diocese of Lugazi
Diocese of Masaka

Ecclesiastical Province of Mbarara
Archdiocese of Mbarara
Diocese of Fort Portal
Diocese of Hoima
Diocese of Kabale
Diocese of Kasese
Diocese of Mbarara

Ecclesiastical Province of Tororo
Archdiocese of Tororo
Diocese of Jinja
Diocese of Kotido
Diocese of Moroto
Diocese of Soroti

External links 
Catholic-Hierarchy entry.
GCatholic.org.

Uganda
Catholic dioceses